Agostino Collaceroni (17th century) was an Italian painter, mainly active in his native Bologna as a painter of quadratura. He trained under Andrea Pozzo. For the church of Sant'Angelo Magno of Ascoli Piceno, he painted quadratura for which Tommaso Nardini painted the figures.

Sources

References

17th-century Italian painters
Italian male painters
Painters from Bologna
Quadratura painters
Year of birth missing
Year of death missing